The Iezer is a left tributary of the river Tutova in Romania. It discharges into the Tutova in the village Iezer.

References

Rivers of Romania
Rivers of Vaslui County